Mubaraka Al-Naimi (born 13 April 2001) is a Qatari professional tennis player. She is currently the Qatari No. 1.

Al-Naimi made her WTA main draw debut at the 2017 Qatar Total Open in the doubles draw partnering Fatma Al-Nabhani.

In 2020, Al-Naimi won the Qatar Rail Tennis Open Tournament. From 2015–19, she played on the Junior ITF Women's Circuit.

References

External links

2001 births
Living people
Qatari female tennis players